Ochlerotatus serratus is a species of mosquito.

See also
 Oropouche fever

References

Ochlerotatus